The Great Nevka or Bolshaya Nevka is an arm of the Neva that begins about  below the Liteyny Bridge in Saint Petersburg.

Attractions 
 Bridges
 Samson Bridge
 Grenadiers Bridge
 Kantemirovsky Bridge
 Ushakovsky Bridge
 3rd Yelagin Bridge
 Saint Petersburg TV Tower
 Russian cruiser Aurora
 Lopukhinsky Garden
 Kamenny Island Palace
 Maritime Victory Park
 Saint Petersburg Botanical Garden
 Monument to Alfred Nobel

See also 
 List of bridges in Saint Petersburg

References 

Rivers of Saint Petersburg
Distributaries of the Neva